Linus Nirmal Gomes, S.J. (7 September 1921 – 27 February 2021) was an Indian Roman Catholic prelate, who served as the first bishop of the newly established diocese of Baruipur since 1977. He retired in 1995.

Gomes was born in the village of Boro Golla, Dhaka, East Bengal. He joined the Society of Jesus on 26 June 1942, and was ordained a priest on 21 November 1954. Gomes was appointed bishop to the Diocese of Baruipur on 30 May 1977 and ordained bishop on 19 November 1977. Gomes retired on 31 October 1995 as bishop of the Baruipur Diocese. He died in February 2021 at the age of 99.

References

External links 

1921 births
2021 deaths
20th-century Roman Catholic bishops in India
21st-century Roman Catholic bishops in India
20th-century Indian Jesuits
Jesuit bishops
21st-century Indian Jesuits